The Dorset County Football Association is the County Football Association for Dorset. The Dorset County FA traces its root back to the South Hants and Dorset Football Association which was founded in 1884. Three years later in 1887, due to the growth of football in the area, the South Hants and Dorset FA split into the Dorset County Football Association and the Hampshire Football Association. They run a number of cups for member clubs of all levels across the county.

Affiliated Leagues
Blackmore Vale League
Dorset Ability Counts League
Dorset Flexi League
Dorset Mini Soccer League
Dorset Youth League
Dorset Walking Football League
Dorset Premier League
Weymouth Sunday League
Dorset Girls League
Dorset League
Dorset Women's League

County Cups

Adult County Cups
Dorset Senior Cup
Dorset Women's Cup
Dorset Senior Trophy
Dorset Junior Cup
Dorset Intermediate Cup
Dorset Minor Cup
Dorset Sunday Challenge Cup
Dorset Sunday Challenge Plate
Dorset U18 Youth Cup

Youth County Cups
Dorset U16 Youth Cup
Dorset U15 Youth Cup
Dorset U14 Youth Cup
Dorset U13 Youth Cup
Dorset U12 Youth Cup
Dorset U11 Youth Cup
Dorset U10 Youth Cup
Dorset U17 Girl's Youth Cup
Dorset U15 Girl's Youth Cup
Dorset U13 Girl's Youth Cup

References

External links
Official website of the Dorset County FA

County football associations
Football in Dorset
Sports organizations established in 1887